MailEnable is a Windows-based, commercial email server distributed by MailEnable Pty. Ltd, an Australian-based software company which was established in 2002.

MailEnable's features include support for IMAP, POP3 and SMTP email protocols with SSL/TLS support, list server, anti-virus and anti-spam and webmail functionality. Administration functions can be performed using the Microsoft Management Console (MMC) or a web browser.

Groupware and collaboration functionality are provided by the use of MAPI, CalDAV, CardDAV, SyncML and Exchange ActiveSync protocols.

According to one survey in May 2016, MailEnable has the largest reported install base on the Windows platform, and ranked fourth all in the list of email servers visible on the internet behind exim, Postfix and Sendmail.

Product editions 
There are four editions of MailEnable;
 Standard (Free, fully functional, POP and SMTP server which also provides IMAP and webmail)
 Professional (Content filtering and antivirus)
 Enterprise (Collaboration/sharing, database and clustering)
 Enterprise Premium (Mobile web administration and unlimited Outlook Client/MAPI connections)

Integration

Control panel support 
MailEnable Standard Edition is installed by default with Plesk Control Panel.

Other supported control panel software includes Hosting Controller, Ensim and WebsitePanel.

Other 
MailEnable integrates with the following content filtering providers;
 MxScan - anti-spam and anti-virus filtering solution
 MagicSpam - anti-spam solution

See also 
 List of mail server software
 Message transfer agent

References 

Email
Microsoft
Internet technology companies of Australia
Internet properties established in 2002
2002 establishments in Australia